Ishige may refer to:

Ishige (alga), a genus of brown algae
Ishige (surname), a Japanese surname
Ishige, Ibaraki, a former town in Yūki District, Ibaraki Prefecture, Japan
Ishige Station, a railway station in Jōsō, Ibaraki Prefecture, Japan